The first Sudurpashchim Provincial Assembly was elected by the 2017 provincial elections. 53 members were elected to the assembly, 32 of whom were elected through direct elections and 21 of whom were elected through the party list proportional representation system. The term of the assembly started on 4 February 2018 and ended in September 2022. Trilochan Bhatta from the CPN (Maoist Centre) served as chief minister during the term of the assembly. Arjun Bahadur Thapa served as the speaker of the assembly and Nirmala Badal Joshi served as the deputy speaker.

Composition

Leaders

Speakers 

 Speaker of the Provincial Assembly: Hon. Arjun Bahadur Thapa
 Deputy Speaker of the Provincial Assembly: Nirmala Badal Joshi

Parliamentary Party Leaders 

 Leader of the House (Nepal Communist Party):Hon. Trilochan Bhatta
 Leader of Opposition (Nepali Congress): Rana Bahadur Rawal

Whips 

 Government Chief Whip (Nepal Communist Party): Tara Lama Tamang
 Whip (Nepal Communist Party): Akkal Bahadur Rawal
 Opposition Chief Whip (Nepali Congress): Govinda Raj Bohora
 Whip (Nepali Congress): Tek Bahadur Raika

List of members

Changes

See also 

 Sudurpashchim Province
 2017 Nepalese provincial elections

References 

Members of the Provincial Assembly of Sudurpashchim Province